Greatest Hits is a greatest hits compilation by the band Quiet Riot released in 1996.

Track listing
"Cum on Feel the Noize"
"Bang Your Head (Metal Health)"
"Slick Black Cadillac"
"The Wild & the Young"
"Mama We're All Crazy Now"
"Party All Night"
"The Joker"
"Stay with Me Tonight"
"Callin' the Shots"
"Bang Your Head (Metal Health)" (live)
"Let's Go Crazy" (live)

Quiet Riot albums
1996 greatest hits albums
Columbia Records compilation albums